Orbitestella parva is a species of minute sea snail, a marine gastropod mollusc in the family Orbitestellidae.

Description
The vitreous-white, very minute shell has a discoidal shape and a flat spire. The shell is smooth and perforate with some growth lines. The protoconch consists of one whorl, rather large and with a bulbous shape.

Distribution
This marine species is endemic to New Zealand.

References

 Powell A. W. B., New Zealand Mollusca, William Collins Publishers Ltd, Auckland, New Zealand 1979 

Orbitestella parva
Gastropods of New Zealand
Gastropods described in 1924
Taxa named by Harold John Finlay